Sir Adrian Alastair Montague  (born February 1948) is a British solicitor and businessman. He has been the chairman of the insurance company Aviva since April 2015.

Early life
Adrian Alastair Montague was born in February 1948. He earned a master of arts degree from Trinity Hall, Cambridge.

Career
Montague began his career as a solicitor for Linklaters & Paines, where he worked from 1971 to 1994. He worked for the investment bank Dresdner Kleinwort from 1994 to 1997. In 1997, he joined the public sector to serve as the chief executive of the Private Finance Initiative Task Force at HM Treasury until 2000, and deputy chairman of Partnerships UK from 2000 to 2001. He was the chairman of British Energy from 2002 to 2009.

In 2008, when Montague was chairman of the insurance company Friends Provident, he turned down an offer from the private equity firm J.C. Flowers to take over the company for 150p a share, only to see Clive Cowdery's Resolution buy it 12 months later for a mere 79p a share.

Montague has been the chairman of Aviva since April 2015, succeeding John McFarlane.

Personal life
Montague has been married three times. He was married to Pamela Evans from 1970 to 1982; they had a son and two daughters. He was married to Penelope Webb from 1986 to 2009, and they had a son. In 2015, he was married for a third time, to Innes Daubeney.

References

Living people
1948 births
Alumni of Trinity Hall, Cambridge
British businesspeople
British chief executives in the energy industry
Commanders of the Order of the British Empire
Aviva people